The Rotes Rathaus (Red City Hall) is the town hall of Berlin, located in the Mitte district on Rathausstraße near Alexanderplatz. It is the home to the governing mayor and the government (the Senate of Berlin) of the state of Berlin. The name of the landmark building dates from the façade design with red clinker bricks.

History
The Rathaus was built between 1861 and 1869 in the style of the Northern Italy High Renaissance by Hermann Friedrich Waesemann. It was modelled on the Old Town Hall of Thorn (today Toruń, Poland), while the architecture of the tower is reminiscent of the cathedral tower of Notre-Dame de Laon in France.  It replaced several individual buildings dating from the Middle Ages and now occupies an entire city block.

The building was heavily damaged by Allied bombing in World War II and rebuilt to the original plans between 1951 and 1956. The Neues Stadthaus, which survived the bombing and had formerly been the head office of Berlin's municipal fire insurance Feuersozietät in Parochialstraße served as the temporary city hall for the post-war city government for all the sectors of Berlin until September 1948.  Following that time, it housed only those of the Soviet sector. The reconstructed Rotes Rathaus, then located in the Soviet sector, served as the town hall of East Berlin, while the Rathaus Schöneberg was the town hall of West Berlin. Located in the soviet sector and later East Germany, "Rotes Rathaus" ("red city hall") was also used figuratively to designate the socialist government of East Berlin, the Magistrat. After German reunification, the administration of reunified Berlin officially moved into the Rotes Rathaus on 1 October 1991.

See also

Senate of Berlin
Mayor of Berlin
List of mayors of Berlin
Alexanderplatz
Nikolaiviertel
Fernsehturm Berlin
Marienkirche
Marx-Engels-Forum
Altes Stadthaus, Berlin

External links

 CityMayors feature
 Red Town Hall 360° Panorama

Buildings and structures in Mitte
City and town halls in Germany
Government buildings completed in 1869
1869 establishments in Prussia
Official residences of subnational executives
Rebuilt buildings and structures in Berlin